Night Work Conventions are International Labour Organization Convention conventions regulating the rights  of night workers. They were specifically aimed at young persons, women or people in specific types of employment (industrial, non-industrial or bakeries) and conceived between 1919 and 1948. A more general instrument (not addressing young people however) was signed in 1990.

Ratifications
An overview of ILO conventions and ratifications is shown below:

External links 
www.ilo.org/ official ILO site.

International Labour Organization conventions
Working time
Treaties concluded in 1919
Treaties concluded in 1925
Treaties concluded in 1934
Treaties concluded in 1946
Treaties concluded in 1990
Treaties entered into force in 1921
Treaties entered into force in 1928
Treaties entered into force in 1950
Treaties entered into force in 1995
Treaties entered into force in 1951
Night